Harve Pierre, also known by the stage name Joe Hooker, is an American writer, singer, producer, and record executive who is president of Bad Boy Entertainment.

Biography
Pierre is an American of Haitian descent.

Guest appearances

Production

Writing

 1997: SWV - "Someone"   |   Release Some Tension
 1998: Total - "If You Want Me"   |   Kima, Keisha, and Pam
 1999: Black Rob - "Whoa!", "Life Story, "   |   Life Story
 2001: P. Diddy & The Bad Boy Family - "That's Crazy"   |   The Saga Continues...
 2003: Loon - "How You Want That", "Things You Do", "Down For Me"   |   Loon

Vocal Production

References

External links
 Harve's MySpace Page
 D-Nice pictures from Harve's Birthday Party

Living people
Record producers from New York (state)
American rappers of Haitian descent
American hip hop record producers
American male singers
American rhythm and blues singers
21st-century American rappers
21st-century American male musicians
Year of birth missing (living people)